Giovanna Pasello (born 29 September 1959) is an Italian sports shooter. She competed in the women's double trap event at the 1996 Summer Olympics.

References

1959 births
Living people
Italian female sport shooters
Olympic shooters of Italy
Shooters at the 1996 Summer Olympics
Place of birth missing (living people)